Exploration Peak Park is an 80-acre regional park in the unincorporated town of Enterprise, Nevada, United States at Exploration Peak. It is among the top rated parks in the Las Vegas Valley.

Amenities and activities
Exploration Peak Park features an Old West-themed playground which represents the Old Spanish Trail trade route, which passed through nearby, picnic areas, horseshoe pits, and volleyball courts.

Exploration Peak
Exploration Peak is the focal point and namesake of the park. There are multiple trails ascending and surrounding the peak, as well as an overlook at the top.

References

Parks in Nevada
Parks in Clark County, Nevada